South Carolina elected its members October 9–10, 1826.

See also 
 1826 and 1827 United States House of Representatives elections
 List of United States representatives from South Carolina

Notes 

1826
South Carolina
United States House of Representatives